Limonia indigena is a species of limoniid crane fly in the family Limoniidae.

Subspecies
These three subspecies belong to the species Limonia indigena:
 Limonia indigena indigena
 Limonia indigena jacksoni (Alexander, 1917)
 Limonia indigena loloensis Alexander, 1958

References

Limoniidae
Articles created by Qbugbot